Lake Sonfon, also known as Lake Confon, is a fresh water mountain lake in Diang, Sierra Leone of religious and cultural significance. The nearest towns are Kabala that is 60 km to the north and Benugu that is 40 km to the south. Sonfon drains from its southern end, which forms the start of the Pampana River, and is fed by seven small streams with its water level varying considerably during the year.

Gold deposits are found in the rocks of Lake Sonfon and in alluvial deposits in the area.  Only the alluvial deposits are being worked employing 15,000 miners around the Lake. This mining is causing the level of water in the lake to decrease.

Although the Sonfon is not well surveyed 105 species of birds have been identified at the lake including the iris glossy-starling, the Dybowski's twinspot, the splendid sunbird, the red-faced pytilia and the pied-winged swallow.  Animals that live at the lake include endangered pygmy hippopotamus, black duikers and Maxwell's duikers.  In the dry season the lake is completely covered with vegetation.  The hill environment around the lake consist of forests, wooded savanah, grassland and farmbush. The Lake is a key conservation area and a proposed protected area but as of 2011 there is no protection in place.

Lake Sonfon is considered sacred in traditional belief with local people carrying out cultural ceremonies along its shore.  Offerings, including rice and food, are floated into the lake on calabashes.  In traditional belief the lake is symbolically intermittent, as well as being intermittent in terms of the amount of water in the dry season and a powerful Djinn lives in the lake.

See also
Protected areas of Sierra Leone 
Wildlife of Sierra Leone

References

Lakes of Sierra Leone
Sacred lakes